Gia Định was a province of South Vietnam surrounding Saigon. It was one of the country's main industrial centers.

It was created in 1832 and split to four smaller provinces in December 1889: Gia Định, Chợ Lớn, Tân An and Tây Ninh.

In 1957 it contained 6 districts, Gò Vấp, Tân Bình, Hóc Môn, Thủ Đức, Nhà Bè and Bình Chánh.

In 1970 Quảng Xuyên and Cần Giờ districts were added.
In February 1976, parts of Biên Hòa, Bình Dương, Đô Thành Saigon and Hậu Nghĩa provinces were annexed to Gia Định and it was renamed to Sài Gòn-Gia Định. On 2 July 1976 it was renamed Hồ Chí Minh City.

Former governors of the province include Nguyễn Văn Thành.

References

Provinces of South Vietnam
History of Ho Chi Minh City